Bremeria is a genus of flowering plants in the family Rubiaceae. It was described in 2005 to accommodate all the Indian Ocean species formerly placed in Mussaenda, except the widespread Mussaenda arcuata. The genus is indigenous to Madagascar, Mauritius and Réunion, and is found in humid to subhumid evergreen forests.

Species 
 Bremeria arachnocarpa  (Wernham) A.P.Davis & Razafim. - Madagascar
 Bremeria decaryi (Homolle) Razafim. & Alejandro - Madagascar
 Bremeria erectiloba (Wernham) Razafim. & Alejandro - Madagascar
 Bremeria eriantha  (A.Rich.) A.P.Davis & Razafim. - Madagascar
 Bremeria fuscopilosa (Baker) Razafim. & Alejandro - Madagascar
 Bremeria humblotii (Wernham) Razafim. & Alejandro - Madagascar
 Bremeria hymenopogonoides (Baker) Razafim. & Alejandro - Madagascar
 Bremeria landia (Poir.) Razafim. & Alejandro - Mauritius + Réunion
Bremeria landia var. holosericea (Sm.) A.P.Davis & Razafim. - Mauritius + Réunion
Bremeria landia var. landia  - Mauritius + Réunion
Bremeria landia var. stadmanii (Michx. ex DC.) A.P.Davis & Razafim. - Mauritius 
 Bremeria latisepala (Homolle) Razafim. & Alejandro - Madagascar
 Bremeria monantha (Wernham) Razafim. & Alejandro - Madagascar
 Bremeria perrieri (Homolle) Razafim. & Alejandro - Madagascar
 Bremeria pervillei (Wernham) Razafim. & Alejandro - Madagascar
 Bremeria pilosa (Baker) Razafim. & Alejandro - Madagascar
 Bremeria punctata (Drake) Razafim. & Alejandro - Madagascar
 Bremeria scabrella  (Wernham) A.P.Davis & Razafim. - Madagascar
 Bremeria scabridior (Wernham) Razafim. & Alejandro - Madagascar
 Bremeria trichophlebia (Baker) Razafim. & Alejandro - Madagascar
 Bremeria vestita (Baker) Razafim. & Alejandro - Madagascar

References

External links 
 Kew World Checklist of Selected Plant Families Bremeria

Rubiaceae genera
Mussaendeae
Flora of Africa